Verlobung im Traum (Betrothal in a Dream) (1928–30) is a German-language opera in two acts by Czech composer Hans Krása with a libretto by Rudolf Fuchs and Rudolf Thomas after the novel Uncle's Dream by Feodor Dostoyevsky.

Performance history
The opera was premiered on 18 May 1933 at the Neues deutsches Theater in Prague under George Szell. Later that year, the work was awarded the Czechoslovak State Prize.

Synopsis

The action takes place in Mordasov, a small Russian town, around 1850.

Prologue

The archivist of Mordasov relates how writer Feodor Dostoevsky has recently paid a visit, researching the life of a certain Zina, a beautiful girl who once lived in the town, for a forthcoming novel.

Act I

Zina is in love with Fedya, a political revolutionary who is on the run from the authorities. Her overbearing mother, Maria Alexandrowna, learns than an aging Prince is visiting the town and sees an opportunity to marry her daughter off. She reasons with Zina that she would soon inherit the old man’s wealth and thus be able to afford proper care for Fedya who is grievously ill. Paul, an old family friend, is also in love with Zina and misses no opportunity to disparage Fedya to her. When the Prince arrives, he is courted and flattered by Zina’s mother who persuades him of her daughter’s beauty and talent. Zina, against her better nature, performs Bellini’s ‘Casta diva’ for the Prince who is enchanted. Maria’s sister-in-law, Nastassja, who feels compassion for the Prince, is appalled by the duplicity of the scheme. A letter arrives from Fedya to Zina, urging her to come quickly and visit him as he feels near to death, but is intercepted and destroyed by Paul. He and Nastassja swear to thwart Maria’s plans.

Act II

The Prince awakes from his afternoon siesta. He remembers proposing to a young girl earlier in the day but Paul convinces him that he must have dreamt the whole thing. The Prince admits he gets confused and decides to leave with Paul the next day. He goes to bid farewell to Maria and Zina and arrives to find the house full of women, invited by Nastassja to witness the ceremony. He rather shamefacedly confesses that he had a dream where he proposed to Zina but the furious Maria insists it was no dream. Zina finally snaps: she tells the Prince that he was duped into proposing to her, she is only interested in Fedya and would have married the Prince only for his money. The Prince appreciates her honesty and forgives her. As he takes his leave, he asks Zina to excuse his temerity for presuming she would ever want to marry him. Zina is overjoyed that she is now free to be with Fedya but a servant arrives to tell her the awful news: Fedya has died.

Epilogue

The archivist explains how, soon after this incident, Zina and her mother moved away and how Zina is now in a loveless marriage with a local official. Her beauty is intact but life and love have for her lost all meaning and purpose.

Recordings
Jane Henschel, Juanita Lascarro, Charlotte Hellekant, Albert Dohnen, Robert Wörle, Michael Kraus, Ernst Senff Chor, Deutsches Symphonie-Orchester Berlin, Lothar Zagrosek. Decca 'Entartete Musik' series, 1998.

References

1933 operas
Operas by Hans Krása